Anthony Colly (1502/3–1574), of Glaston, Rutland, was an English politician.

He married Catherine, the daughter of William Skeffington, MP for Leicestershire, and they had three daughters.

He was a Member (MP) of the Parliament of England for Rutland in 1545, 1547, March 1553, April 1554, November 1554 and 1563.

References

1502 births
1574 deaths
People from Rutland
English MPs 1545–1547
English MPs 1547–1552
English MPs 1554
English MPs 1554–1555
English MPs 1563–1567